Hatfield is a metrorail station on the Gautrain rapid transit system in the Pretoria (Tshwane metropolitan area) suburb of Hatfield, Gauteng. It was opened on 2 August 2011 as part of the second phase of the Gautrain project.

Location
The above- and underground station area is located east of the centre of Pretoria between Grosvenor Street and Jan Shoba Street (M7)(old Duncan Street). North-east of the station is the M2 motorway junction and the N1 national road. The Hatfield station forms the northern terminus on the north–south route of the Gautrain and allows passengers to pass to the PRASA rail network.

Passengers travelling to OR Tambo International Airport will have to change trains at Sandton station, for a direct 15-minute transit to the airport.

Connections with other modes of transport
The station can be reached by various modes of transport. These include the Gautrain bus service for Gautrain passengers, a dedicated feeder system at the stations. Not far from the station is the station Hartbeesspruit of PRASA, whose tracks run parallel to the Gautrain. Short-term car parking spaces are available in the vicinity of the Gautrain station.

Gautrain passengers can reach the station's platforms via stairs and escalators/elevators.

Urban functional areas and attractions near the station
University of Pretoria, other educational institutions,
University sports facilities and the Loftus Versfeld Stadium,
Shopping and business centers Hatfield and Brooklyn Mall,
Diplomatic missions for most countries.

External links
Official Gautrain site

Gautrain
Railway stations in South Africa
Railway stations opened in 2011
Transport in Pretoria
Railway stations in South Africa opened in the 21st century